Szczepan Stanisław Skomra (born 12 August 1949 in Wysoka) is a Polish politician. He was elected to the Sejm on 25 September 2005, getting 6348 votes in 7 Chełm district as a candidate from the Democratic Left Alliance list.

He was also a member of Sejm 1993-1997, Sejm 1997-2001, and Sejm 2001-2005.

See also
Members of Polish Sejm 2005-2007

External links
Szczepan Skomra - parliamentary page - includes declarations of interest, voting record, and transcripts of speeches.

1949 births
Living people
Democratic Left Alliance politicians
Members of the Polish Sejm 1993–1997
Members of the Polish Sejm 1997–2001
Members of the Polish Sejm 2001–2005
Members of the Polish Sejm 2005–2007